Gary Euton, better known as Gee Money (born September 25, 1968 in Staten Island) is an American radio and television personality and actor. He was a radio personality in St. Maarten on Laser 101.1 FM.

Since 1999, he has hosted a weekday radio program, The AM/PM Workload Show, from FM radio station 101.1 Laser in St. Maarten. On his radio show, Gee Money has interviewed many celebrities including The Black Eyed Peas, Ne-Yo, Johnnie Cochran, Jimmy Cliff, Shaggy, Sean Paul, Damian Marley, Akon, Fat Joe, A.J. Calloway, Wyclef Jean, Fabolous and Bill Bellamy. Bill Bellamy is a good friend of Gee Money and is a frequent guest on his show when in St. Maarten. In 2004, Gee Money was voted radio host of the year and again in 2007.

He has hosted the Heineken Green Synergy DJ Competition Finals for the past five years which can be seen on the cable network Tempo TV throughout the Caribbean, he also hosted many concerts and events in St. Maarten, as well as throughout the Caribbean. In 2008 he hosted the inaugural Romantic Rhythms Music Festival in Antigua.

Gee Money made an appearance on Showtime in Family Business 4th season (episode 4 Taint Marten) as himself.

Gee Money played the role of Johan in the 2007 independent feature film The Panman: Rhythm of the Palms; the movie has picked up two awards, winning the best feature film category at the Hollywood Black Film Festival, and Best Score at the Brooklyn International Film Festival, both in June 2008.

Gee Money was born on Staten Island, and attended Susan E. Wagner High School where amongst his classmates was Rich Eisen from ESPN and the NFL Network. He also attended the State University of New York at Morrisville, also known as Morrisville State College where he graduated in 1989 with an associate degree in Applied Science.

References
King plays for God on Sint Maarten: "He is healed, it is a miracle "https://www.ad.nl/show/koning-speelt-voor-god-op-sint-maarten-hij-is-genezen-het-is-een-wonder~a7ce7d1f/

External links 
 Official Facebook
 

Living people
African-American male actors
American male actors
American radio personalities
People from Staten Island
Morrisville State College alumni
1968 births
21st-century African-American people
20th-century African-American people